Alphadontidae was a family of mammals belonging to the clade Metatheria, the group of mammals that includes modern-day marsupials.

References

Prehistoric mammal families
Prehistoric metatherians